Herbert House may refer to:

Buildings
 Alois Herbert Double House, Saint Joseph, Missouri, listed on the NRHP in Buchanan County, Missouri
 Thomas Galbraith Herbert House, Leesville, South Carolina, listed on the National Register of Historic Places in Lexington County, South Carolina
 John Herbert House, Franklin, Tennessee, listed on the NRHP in Williamson County, Tennessee
 Herbert House (Hampton, Virginia), listed on the National Register of Historic Places in Hampton, Virginia
 Herbert House, Kennington, house in Kennington, London
 Sir Thomas Herbert's House, in York, England

People
 Herbert O. House (1929–2013), American organic chemist